Kot Jai is a town and union council in Dera Ismail Khan District of Khyber-Pakhtunkhwa, Pakistan.

Kot Jai has a population of over 10,000. Facilities include a bank, a post office, schools, and a bazaar of about 200 shops.

It is situated about 43 km from Dera Ismail Khan, 18 km from Paharpur Tehsil, 44 km from Chasmma Berrege and 58 km from Mianwali District.  Nearby villages include Meran Jai (Lundi) to the east, Jara one km to the west where there is a great Muddrassa "Baab un Najaf Jara" , Dhakki 4.5 km to the north, Sadalian and Khanu Khel about 1.5 to 2 km to the south.

A hospital of about 20 beds is operational day and night. It had high schools both for boys and girls and four primary schools for boys and one primary school for girls. Private institutes include Al-Hudabia Public High School, Minnhaj Public School and Al-Quraish Public School. It has also a veterinary hospital. To facilitate farmer for selling animal a market is held every week on Saturday by government contractor. It is situated at a bank of Chasma road. It also had a bus stand, where convenience facility is available between  dera ismail khan and kot jai.
Every year cattle show (bull race) is held there and a show of camels weight lifting where winners are awarded with prizes and praise.

References

Populated places in Dera Ismail Khan District